Philip Carrington (6 July 1892 – 3 October 1975) was an eminent Anglican  priest and author, the seventh
Bishop of Quebec and the eleventh Metropolitan of Canada.

Born into an ecclesiastical family and educated at Christ's College, Christchurch and the University of Canterbury, he was ordained in 1919. At first he specialised in work with the Boy Scouts and was then Rector of Lincoln, New Zealand. After this he was Warden of St Barnabas Theological College, North Adelaide then dean of Divinity at Bishop's University, Lennoxville. In 1935 he was elevated to the episcopate and retired in 1960.

Notes

External links
Bibliographic directory from Project Canterbury
Stuart A. Rose Manuscript, Archives, and Rare Books Library

1892 births
1975 deaths
People from Lichfield
People educated at Christ's College, Christchurch
University of Canterbury alumni
Anglican Church of Canada deans
Academic staff of Bishop's University
Anglican bishops of Quebec
20th-century Anglican Church of Canada bishops
Metropolitans of Canada
20th-century Anglican archbishops
New Zealand emigrants to Canada